Perpetual Desolation is the second and final studio album by the Norwegian gothic metal band The Sins of Thy Beloved. It was recorded and mixed at Sound Suite Studio during September/October 1999 and released in 2000 through Napalm Records.

Track listing

Personnel

The Sins of Thy Beloved
Anita Auglend - vocals
Glenn Morten Nordbø - guitars, vocals
Arild Christensen - guitars, vocals
Ingfrid Stensland - keyboards
Anders Thue - keyboards, piano
Ola Aarrestad - bass
Stig Johansen - drums

Additional musicians
Pete Johansen - violin

Production
Terje Refsnes - producer, engineer, mixing with The Sins of Thy Beloved
Petter Hegre - photography
Tor Søreide - artwork, design, lettering

2000 albums
The Sins of Thy Beloved albums
Napalm Records albums